Kricogonia is a genus of butterflies in the family Pieridae. They are native to the Americas.

The genus was erected in 1863 by Tryon Reakirt.

Species
 Kricogonia cabrerai Ramsden, 1920
 Kricogonia lyside (Godart, 1819) – lyside sulphur

References

External links

 

Coliadinae
Taxa named by Tryon Reakirt
Pieridae genera